Blurt is the debut studio album by English post-punk band Blurt, released in 1982 by record label Red Flame.

It was reissued in 2009 by LTM Recordings as Blurt + Singles.

Track listing
Lyrics by Ted Milton.  Music by Ted Milton, Pete Creese and Jake Milton.
"Dog Save My Sole" 4:37
"Trees" 6:49
"Physical Fitness" 6:59
"Empty Vessels" 3:01
"Play the Game" 3:58
"The Ruminant Plinth" 5:37
"Arthur" 7:08

Personnel
Ted Milton: Vocals, Saxophone
Peter Creese: Guitars
Jake Milton: Drums, Percussionn

Reception 

Trouser Press described Blurt as "one of the trio's artiest and most orderly works".

References

External links 
 

1982 debut albums
Blurt albums